Rustam Rakhmonovich Abdullaev (born 1 January 1971) is a former footballer and football coach. He is a former member of the Uzbekistan national team. He recently worked as head coach of Kokand 1912.

Playing career
In 1992, he played for Temiryo'lchi Qo'qon and became 2nd best goalscorer of Oliy League after Valeriy Kechinov. His club finished at 6th position. At the same year he was named 2nd best player following Valeriy Kechinov who was named Player of the Year 1992.

Abdullaev played for Uzbekistan national team in the 1994 Asian Games football tournament in Hiroshima (the first time Uzbekistan played a football tournaments after got independence from Soviet Union and winning the gold medal).

Managing career
On 30 April 2014 he was appointed as head coach of Kokand 1912, after his predecessor in the club, Tokhir Kapadze moved to Neftchi Farg'ona as club chairman.

Honours

Club
Neftchi Farg'ona
Uzbek League (1): 1993

MHSK Tashkent
Uzbek League (1): 1997

Pakhtakor
Uzbek League (1): 1998

Individual
Uzbekistan Footballer of the Year runner-up: 1992
Uzbek League Top Scorer 2nd: 1992 (18 goals)

International

Asian Games winner: 1994

References

External links
 
 Uzbekistan national football team stats (Russian)

1971 births
Living people
Sportspeople from Tashkent
Soviet footballers
Uzbekistani footballers
Uzbekistani expatriate footballers
Uzbekistan international footballers
Uzbekistani expatriate sportspeople in Malaysia
Expatriate footballers in Malaysia
Pakhtakor Tashkent FK players
Perlis FA players
Association football midfielders